Nesopholcomma is a monotypic genus of Asian comb-footed spiders containing the single species, Nesopholcomma izuense. It was first described by H. Ono in 2010, and has only been found in Japan.

See also
 List of Theridiidae species

References

Monotypic Araneomorphae genera
Spiders of Asia
Theridiidae